Armantas Vitkauskas (born 23 March 1989) is a Lithuanian professional footballer who plays as a goalkeeper for FK Riteriai.

Vitkauskas made his debut for Lithuania in a friendly match against Estonia. The match ended in a 1–1 draw.

Career
He started his career in 2007. He played for FK Sūduva back then. Later, he became goalkeeper of Žalgiris Vilnius. In 2018, he played for Concordia Chiajna.

Since 2018 he was a player of Žalgiris Vilnius. After 2019 season he left FK Žalgiris.

On 24 December 2020, FK Kauno Žalgiris signed Vitkauskas.

Honours

Club
Sūduva
Lithuanian Cup (1): 2009
Lithuanian Supercup (1): 2009
Žalgiris Vilnius
Lithuanian Championship (4): 2013, 2014, 2015, 2016
Lithuanian Cup (7): 2011–12, 2012–13, 2013–14, 2014–15, 2015–16, 2016, 2018
Lithuanian Super Cup (5): 2013, 2014, 2015, 2016, 2017

Individual
 2009 LFF Supercup MVP

References

External links
 Armantas Vitkauskas player info at Futbolas.lt 
 Stats
 

1989 births
Living people
Lithuanian footballers
Association football goalkeepers
Lithuania international footballers
Romania youth international footballers
A Lyga players
FK Sūduva Marijampolė players
FK Žalgiris players
Liga I players
CS Concordia Chiajna players
Lithuanian expatriate footballers
Lithuanian expatriate sportspeople in Romania
Expatriate footballers in Romania